Sir Robert Salusbury Cotton, 3rd Baronet (2 January 1695 – 27 August 1748) was a politician in Great Britain. He was Member of Parliament (MP) for Cheshire from 1727 to 1734 and for Lostwithiel from 1741 to 1747.

He married Elizabeth Tollemache (died 6 August 1746), the daughter of Lionel Tollemache, 3rd Earl of Dysart and his wife Grace Wilbraham.

See also 
Viscount Combermere

References

External links 
ThePeerage.com

1695 births
1748 deaths
Cotton, Sir Robert, 3rd Baronet
Members of the Parliament of Great Britain for English constituencies
Lord-Lieutenants of Denbighshire
Members of the Parliament of Great Britain for constituencies in Cornwall